Michael Wakefield  (born January 12, 1994) is a professional Canadian football defensive lineman for the Ottawa Redblacks of the Canadian Football League (CFL).

University career 
Wakefield played college football for the FIU Panthers from 2012 to 2015.

Professional career

Washington Redskins 
After not being selected in the 2016 NFL Draft, Wakefield signed with the Washington Redskins as an undrafted free agent in 2016, but was among the final training camp cuts in September 2016.

Ottawa Redblacks 
On June 12, 2017, Wakefield signed with the Ottawa Redblacks. He played in his first professional game on August 31, 2017, against the Montreal Alouettes where he recorded one defensive tackle. That year, he played in six regular season games where he had four defensive tackles.

In 2018, Wakefield played in 17 regular season games where he had 18 defensive tackles and three sacks. He also played in his first career post-season games, in the East Final and the 106th Grey Cup. However, he did not record any statistics in the championship game as the Redblacks lost to the Calgary Stampeders. He re-signed with the Redblacks to a one-year extension on December 14, 2018. He had 32 defensive tackles, four sacks, and one interception in 16 games in 2019 as the Redblacks missed the post-season.

Wakefield re-signed with the Redblacks on January 20, 2020, but did not play that year due to the cancellation of the 2020 CFL season. He became a free agent upon the expiry of his contract on February 9, 2021.

Montreal Alouettes 
On February 9, 2021, it was announced that Wakefield had signed with the Montreal Alouettes. He played in 12 regular season games where he had 23 defensive tackles and four sacks.

Personal life 
Wakefield was born to parents James and Alfrenett Wakefield. He has four siblings, Lakeshia, Akeem, Jamie, and Jeremy.

References

External links 
Montreal Alouettes bio 

1994 births
Living people
American football defensive linemen
American players of Canadian football
Canadian football defensive linemen
Ottawa Redblacks players
Montreal Alouettes players
Players of American football from Georgia (U.S. state)
Players of Canadian football from Georgia (U.S. state)
Washington Commanders players
FIU Panthers football players